Massimo Natili (28 July 1935 – 19 September 2017) was a racing driver from Italy.  He participated in two Formula One World Championship Grands Prix, debuting on 15 July 1961. He scored no championship points.

Career
Natili started in Formula One with Scuderia Centro Sud in 1961 with a retirement from the Syracuse Grand Prix, followed by a failure to qualify for the Naples Grand Prix.  He retired on the first lap of the 1961 British Grand Prix with gearbox failure, and practiced for the Italian Grand Prix but did not start.

In 1962, Natili was involved in a fiery accident in a Formula Junior race at Monza, and was rescued by an anonymous spectator. He came 4th in the 1964 Rome Grand Prix after retiring from the previous year's event, and subsequently competed in Italian Formula 3.

Complete Formula One World Championship results
(key)

24 Hours of Le Mans results

References

1935 births
2017 deaths
Italian racing drivers
Italian Formula One drivers
Scuderia Centro Sud Formula One drivers
24 Hours of Le Mans drivers
World Sportscar Championship drivers
Sportspeople from the Province of Viterbo